The Tourmakeady Formation is a geologic formation in Ireland. It preserves fossils dating back to the Ordovician period.

See also

 List of fossiliferous stratigraphic units in Ireland

References
 

Geologic formations of Ireland
Ordovician System of Europe
Ordovician Ireland
Ordovician southern paleotemperate deposits